In enzymology, a rifamycin-B oxidase is an enzyme that catalyzes the chemical reaction

rifamycin B + O2  rifamycin O + H2O2

Thus, the two substrates of this enzyme are rifamycin B and O2, whereas its two products are rifamycin O and H2O2.

This enzyme belongs to the family of oxidoreductases, specifically those acting on diphenols and related substances as donor with oxygen as acceptor.  The systematic name of this enzyme class is rifamycin-B:oxygen oxidoreductase. This enzyme is also called rifamycin B oxidase.

References

 

EC 1.10.3
Enzymes of unknown structure